Kartikey Malviya is an Indian child actor. He is well known for his role as Young Shani in the popular mythological soap Karmaphal Daata Shani that aired on Colors TV. Malviya was last seen in Chandragupta Maurya. He plays the role of Samba (Son of Lord Krishna) in the series RadhaKrishn.

Career

Malviya made his television debut on the show India's Best Dramebaaz. He appeared in several episodes and was the season 2 runner-up. For his performance, Malviya earned the nickname of "Mytho King" from judge Sajid Khan. On the show, Malviya portrayed mythological characters including Karna, Jatayu, and Bhagat Singh. The performances established Malviya as a well-known actor.

In April 2018, Malviya promoted India's Best Dramebaaz, when he encouraged talented children of Bhopal to audition for the show's third season.

In April 2016, Malviya began playing young Shani Dev in Indian television show Karmphaldata Shani. Initially, Malviya was signed for 20 episodes, but due to the actor's high popularity, Malviya was able to renew his contract in October 2017.

Malviya reportedly bonds well with his co-stars including his onscreen mother Juhi Parmar. Malviya has publicly proclaimed that fellow actor Tarun Khanna, is his 'Dronacharya'. Malviya has visited Lucknow, Ahmedabad, and Indore for the promotion of the show. Malviya has also promoted the show by making appearances on television show Bigg Boss 10 in character.

The show has been dubbed in many Indian languages like Bengali, Tamil, Telugu, and Malayalam. In Malayalam, it is dubbed in the name of Shaneeshwaran on Surya TV. In  in Colors Tamil. As a result, Malviya's popularity has grown in the whole of India especially in Kerala, Nepal, Myanmar, Indonesia, and Bangladesh. Malviya had been called to attend the Meet and Greet show in Indonesia.

Malviya portrayed the role of young Chandragupta Maurya in the historical drama series Chandragupta Maurya on Sony TV. From 2020, he is portraying the negative role of Samba, son of Lord Krishna and his wife Queen Jambavati in Star Bharat's popular show Radha Krishna.

Personal life 
Malviya was born in Itarsi, India, to father Mahesh Malviya and mother Neelima Malviya. Malviya became the first runner up in India's Best Dramebaaz. His father is an ordinance factory employee in Itarsi. Kartikey also has an older sister named Nupur Malviya who made a television appearance on Zee TV's Sa Re Ga Ma Pa. For her performance, Nupur won a number of awards. For now, she is pursuing MBBS in Indore vicinity.

Malviya learned acting from his mother, who is knowledgeable in the field of Bharatnatyam. After Malviya's performance on the television show India's Best Dramebaaz, He received an acting tutor on set, which was provided by the production house. Malviya has been reportedly using online studying tools in between his shooting schedule so that he could continue with his education. He successfully passed the 10th CBSE board exam in March 2019. He has chosen to pursue the  humanities stream there after.

In October 2017, Malviya had minor vocal cord surgery.

Television

Awards and honours

Awards 
Malviya won several awards for his lead performance in Karmphaldata Shani. This includes an award by ABP News for completion of 13 successful years on its popular TV news show Saas Bahu Aur Saazish Telebrations.

Honours 
In March 2018, Malviya was invited to Punjab to celebrate the holiday Shri Ram Navami, as a chief guest at Siddh Shaktipeeth Shri Devi Talab Mandir, Jalandhar.

In April 2018, Malviya visited Bhopal to promote India's Best Dramebaaz. Malviya has also attend social events, including Help A Star with actors Gautam Rode and Shreyas Talpade.

References

Living people
21st-century Indian male child actors
Male actors in Hindi cinema
Male actors from Madhya Pradesh
People from Hoshangabad district
2000s births